The 1986 FIBA European Super Cup was the 1st official edition of the FIBA European Super Cup for men's professional basketball clubs. The 2 game aggregate score tournament took place at the Dom Sportova arena in Zagreb, Yugoslavia, on October 7, 1986, and at the Palau Blaugrana, Barcelona, Spain, on October 28, 1986, in order to determine the unofficial European club super champion. The tournament was contested between the 1985–86 season FIBA European Champions Cup champions, Cibona, and the 1985–86 season FIBA European Cup Winners' Cup champions, FC Barcelona.

Series summary

Game 1

Game 2

References

1986
1986–87 in European basketball
1986–87 in Spanish basketball
1986–87 in Yugoslav basketball
International basketball competitions hosted by Spain
International basketball competitions hosted by Yugoslavia
International basketball competitions hosted by Croatia
International basketball competitions hosted by Catalonia